Besserud is a station on the Holmenkollen Line (Line 1) on the Oslo Metro, between Midtstuen and Holmenkollen.

History
The station was opened as the terminus of the Holmenkollen Line on 31 May 1889, and was originally named Holmenkollen. When the line was extended to Frognerseteren on 16 May 1916 the station acquired its current name. The architect for the wooden station building was Paul Due.

References

Oslo Metro stations in Oslo
Railway stations opened in 1898
1898 establishments in Norway
Holmenkollen